Murder on the Orient Express is a 1974 British mystery film directed by Sidney Lumet, produced by John Brabourne and Richard Goodwin, and based on the 1934 novel of the same name by Agatha Christie.

The film features the Belgian detective, Hercule Poirot (Albert Finney), who is asked to investigate the murder of an American business tycoon aboard the Orient Express train. The suspects are portrayed by an all-star cast, including Lauren Bacall, Ingrid Bergman, Sean Connery, John Gielgud, Jean-Pierre Cassel, Vanessa Redgrave, Michael York, Rachel Roberts, Jacqueline Bisset, Anthony Perkins, Richard Widmark and Wendy Hiller. The screenplay is by Paul Dehn.

The film was a commercial and critical success. Bergman won the Academy Award for Best Supporting Actress, and the film received five other nominations at the 47th Academy Awards: Best Actor (Finney), Best Adapted Screenplay, Best Original Score, Best Cinematography, and Best Costume Design.

Plot

The opening of the film shows news clippings of the 1930 kidnapping of Daisy Armstrong, who is later found murdered.

In December 1935, Hercule Poirot, having solved a case for a British Army garrison in Jordan, is due to travel to London on the Orient Express from Istanbul and encounters his old friend Signor Bianchi, a director of the company that owns the line who offers him a compartment. The other passengers are American widow Harriet Belinda Hubbard; English governess Mary Debenham; Swedish missionary Greta Ohlsson; American businessman Samuel Ratchett, with his secretary/translator Hector McQueen and English valet Edward Beddoes; Italian-American car salesman Antonio ("Gino") Foscarelli; elderly Russian Princess Natalia Dragomiroff and her German maid Hildegarde Schmidt; Hungarian Count Rudolf Andrenyi and his wife Elena; British Indian Army Colonel John Arbuthnott; and American theatrical agent Cyrus Hardman.

The morning after the train departs, Ratchett tries to secure Poirot's services as a bodyguard for $15,000 as he has received death threats. Poirot declines Ratchett's offer, telling him, "...my interest in your case is... dwindling." That night, Bianchi gives Poirot his compartment and shares a coach with Stavros Constantine, a Greek doctor. The train is stopped by a snowdrift between Vinkovci and Brod in Yugoslavia, and Poirot is awoken from sleep several times, once by a scream from Ratchett's cabin. The next morning, Ratchett is found stabbed to death, and Bianchi asks Poirot to solve the case. Poirot enlists help from Dr. Constantine, who ascertains that Ratchett was stabbed 12 times in a distorted pattern and with seemingly varying accuracy and lethality.

Found at the crime scene is a fragment of a letter, revealing that Ratchett was actually Lanfranco Cassetti, a gangster, who five years earlier planned the kidnapping and murder of Daisy Armstrong, infant daughter of wealthy British Army Colonel Hamish Armstrong and his American wife, Sonia. Cassetti had a Mafia colleague help him kidnap and kill Daisy, but then betrayed him and fled the country with the ransom money; he was only revealed on the eve of his partner's execution. Overcome with grief, the pregnant Mrs. Armstrong gave premature birth to a stillborn baby and died in the process. Colonel Armstrong, consumed by grief from the loss of his family, committed suicide. A French maidservant named Paulette, wrongly suspected of complicity in the kidnapping, had also committed suicide to avoid being arrested, but was found innocent afterwards. Further clues are discovered, including a pipe cleaner, a handkerchief with the initial "H", Cassetti's broken watch, and a conductor's suit. Poirot's timeline of passenger activities the night before indicates that Cassetti was murdered at about 1:15 a.m., the time of the smashed watch and the scream. As the coach was isolated through the night, the murderer must be one of its passengers or the train's French conductor, Pierre Michel. Mrs. Hubbard reports that she detected a man in her room, later finding the bloodied knife discarded in her compartment. Foscarelli dramatically hints the murder was most likely part of a Mafia feud.

Poirot interviews the passengers and Pierre. He learns McQueen was the son of the Armstrong case's District Attorney and was very fond of Mrs. Armstrong; Beddoes had been a British Army batman; Greta Ohlsson appears to have limited knowledge of English but has been to America; Countess Andrenyi is of German descent, and her maiden name is Grünwald (German for "Greenwood", Mrs. Armstrong's maiden name); Pierre Michel's daughter died five years earlier of scarlet fever; Colonel Arbuthnott, who displays knowledge of Armstrong's military decorations, reveals his plans to marry Miss Debenham once his divorce from his philandering
wife is finalized, which he claims was what the cryptic discussion Poirot overheard in Istanbul was about. When Poirot questions Princess Dragomiroff, he discovers she was a friend of Linda Arden, retired American actress and Mrs. Armstrong's mother; the Princess was Sonia's godmother. He learns that the Armstrongs had a butler, a secretary, a cook, a chauffeur, and a nursemaid. Poirot flatters the Princess's maid, Schmidt, by noting how fine a cook she is, throwing her off. Foscarelli denies having been a chauffeur. Hardman reveals he is, in fact, a Pinkerton detective hired as a bodyguard by Cassetti. When Poirot shows him the photo of Paulette, he is visibly moved.

Poirot gathers the suspects and describes two solutions to the murder. He advises them not to automatically dismiss either. The first suggests Cassetti's murder was a Mafia feud killing - an unknown man disguised himself as conductor, stabbed Ratchett/Cassetti, and, disregarding the uniform coat, with the undetected assailant escaping from the train through the snow. This is rejected by Bianchi and Dr. Constantine as absurd but Poirot tells them they may reconsider that opinion. 

The second, more complex and far-reaching solution links all the suspects in the coach to the Armstrong case. In addition to self-incriminating revelations Poirot had managed to extract from Hardman, McQueen, Schmidt, and the Princess, the detective has deduced Countess Elena is actually Mrs. Armstrong's younger sister, Helena. The Princess claimed the Armstrongs' secretary's was a "Miss Freebody"; this is in fact Mary Debenham, freely associated from the well-known British department store (at that time known as "Debenhams and Freebody"). Beddoes was Armstrong's butler in the Army; Greta Ohlsson was Daisy's nursemaid; Colonel Arbuthnott was a close army friend of Armstrong; Foscarelli was the family's chauffeur; Pierre was Paulette's father; Hardman was a policeman in love with Paulette; and Mrs. Hubbard is in fact Linda Arden, Mrs. Armstrong's mother - and arguably the brains behind this whole plan. McQueen had drugged Cassetti, rendering him unconscious and allowing the conspirators to murder him jointly (the Andrenyis stabbing together), totaling 12 – the  complement of a typical jury – wounds of differing damage. The scream and broken watch were provided by McQueen to persuade Poirot that the murder had occurred earlier, when the other suspects were in the clear. In fact, the suspects joined to commit the murder once Poirot had returned to sleep, after two o'clock. The only passengers not involved in the murder are Signor Bianchi and Dr. Constantine.

Poirot asks Bianchi to choose one solution before the train is freed from the snowdrift, but admits that the Yugoslavian police will much prefer the simple one. Bianchi, in sympathy with the suspects after learning how evil Cassetti was, proposes the first solution, and Dr. Constantine and Poirot agree, although he will struggle with his conscience. The train then, somewhat symbolically, is freed from the snowdrift and resumes its journey.

Cast

 Albert Finney as Hercule Poirot
 Lauren Bacall as Mrs. Hubbard/Linda Arden
 Martin Balsam as Bianchi
 Ingrid Bergman as Greta Ohlsson
 Jacqueline Bisset as Countess Helena Andrenyi
 Jean-Pierre Cassel as Pierre Paul Michel
 Sean Connery as Colonel Arbuthnott
 John Gielgud as Edward Beddoes
 Rachel Roberts as Hildegarde Schmidt 
 Anthony Perkins as Hector McQueen
 Vanessa Redgrave as Mary Debenham
 Wendy Hiller as Princess Natalia Dragomiroff
 Richard Widmark as Ratchett/Lanfranco Cassetti
 Michael York as Count Rudolf Andrenyi
 Colin Blakely as Cyrus B. Hardman
 George Coulouris as Dr. Constantine
 Denis Quilley as Antonio Foscarelli
 Vernon Dobtcheff as Concierge
 Jeremy Lloyd as A.D.C.
 John Moffatt as Chief Attendant

Production

Development
Dame Agatha Christie had been quite displeased with some film adaptations of her works made in the 1960s, and accordingly was unwilling to sell any more film rights. When Nat Cohen, chairman of EMI Films, and producer John Brabourne attempted to get her approval for this film, they felt it necessary to have Lord Mountbatten of Burma (of the British royal family and also Brabourne's father-in-law) help them broach the subject. In the end, according to Christie's husband, Sir Max Mallowan: "Agatha herself has always been allergic to the adaptation of her books by the cinema, but was persuaded to give a rather grudging appreciation to this one." According to one report, Christie gave approval because she liked the previous films of the producers, Romeo and Juliet and Tales of Beatrix Potter.

Casting
Christie's biographer Gwen Robyns quoted her as saying, "It was well made except for one mistake. It was Albert Finney, as my detective Hercule Poirot. I wrote that he had the finest moustache in England—and he didn't in the film. I thought that a pity—why shouldn't he?"

Cast members eagerly accepted upon first being approached. Lumet went to Sean Connery first, who admitted that he had been "stupidly flattered" by Lumet saying that if you get the biggest star, the rest will come along. Bergman was initially offered the role of Princess Dragomiroff, but instead requested to play Greta Ohlsson. Lumet said:

Bergman won an Academy Award for Best Supporting Actress for the portrayal. 
The entire budget was provided by EMI. The cost of the cast came to £554,100.

Filming
Unsworth shot the film with Panavision cameras. Interiors were filmed at Elstree Studios. Exterior shooting was mostly done in France in 1973, with a railway workshop near Paris standing in for Istanbul station. The scenes of the train proceeding through Central Europe were filmed in the Jura Mountains on the then-recently closed railway line from Pontarlier to Gilley, with the scenes of the train stuck in snow being filmed in a cutting near Montbenoît. There were concerns about a lack of snow in the weeks preceding the scheduled shooting of the snowbound train, and plans were made to truck in large quantities of snow at considerable expense. However, heavy snowfall the night before the shooting made the extra snow unnecessary—just as well, as the snow-laden backup trucks had themselves become stuck in the snow.

Music
Richard Rodney Bennett's Orient Express theme has been reworked into an orchestral suite and performed and recorded several times. It was performed on the original soundtrack album by the Orchestra of the Royal Opera House, Covent Garden under Marcus Dods. The piano soloist was the composer himself.

Reception

Box office
Murder on the Orient Express  was released theatrically in the UK on 24 November 1974. The film was a success at the box office, given its tight budget of $1.4 million, earning $36 million in North America, making it the 11th highest-grossing film of 1974. Nat Cohen claimed it was the first film completely financed by a British company to make the top of the weekly US box office charts in Variety.

Critical response
On Rotten Tomatoes the film holds an approval rating of 90% based on 40 reviews, with an average rating of 7.8/10. The website's critics consensus reads: "Murder, intrigue, and a star-studded cast make this stylish production of Murder on the Orient Express one of the best Agatha Christie adaptations to see the silver screen." On Metacritic it has a weighted average score of 63 out of 100, based on 8 critics, indicating "generally favorable reviews".

Roger Ebert gave the film three stars out of four, writing that it "provides a good time, high style, a loving salute to an earlier period of filmmaking". The New York Timess chief critic of the era, Vincent Canby, wrote:

[...] had Dame Agatha Christie's Murder on the Orient Express been made into a movie 40 years ago (when it was published here as Murder on the Calais Coach), it would have been photographed in black-and-white on a back lot in Burbank or Culver City, with one or two stars and a dozen character actors and studio contract players. Its running time would have been around 67 minutes and it could have been a very respectable B-picture. Murder on the Orient Express wasn't made into a movie 40 years ago, and after you see the Sidney Lumet production that opened yesterday at the Coronet, you may be both surprised and glad it wasn't. An earlier adaptation could have interfered with plans to produce this terrifically entertaining super-valentine to a kind of whodunit that may well be one of the last fixed points in our inflationary universe.

Agatha Christie
Christie, who died fourteen months after the release of the film, stated this and Witness for the Prosecution were the only movie adaptations of her books which she liked although she expressed disappointment with Poirot (Finney)'s moustache, which was far from the fabulous hirsute creation she had detailed in her mysteries.

Awards and nominations

See also 
 "Murder on the Orient Express" (2010) episode of Agatha Christie's Poirot
 Murder on the Orient Express (2017 film), directed by and starring Kenneth Branagh

References

External links

 
 
 
 
 
 

1974 films
1974 crime drama films
1974 independent films
1970s mystery films
British crime drama films
British independent films
British mystery films
British detective films
EMI Films films
1970s English-language films
Films about murder
Films based on crime novels
Films based on Hercule Poirot books
Films directed by Sidney Lumet
Films featuring a Best Supporting Actress Academy Award-winning performance
Films scored by Richard Rodney Bennett
Films set in 1930
Films set in 1935
Films set in Istanbul
Films set in Yugoslavia
Films set on the Orient Express
Films set on trains
Films shot at EMI-Elstree Studios
Films shot in England
Films shot in France
Films shot in Turkey
Films with screenplays by Paul Dehn
Paramount Pictures films
Fiction about child murder
1970s British films
Murder on the Orient Express